Fred Sexton (June 3, 1907 – September 11, 1995) was an American artist and creator of the Maltese Falcon statuette prop for the 1941 Warner Bros. film production, The Maltese Falcon.

During the 1930s and 1940s, Sexton was championed by Los Angeles Times Art Critic Arthur Millier, and his work was collected by Los Angeles-area art collectors including actor Edward G. Robinson and movie director John Huston.

Sexton also taught art and headed the Art Students League in Los Angeles between 1949 and 1953.

Career and exhibitions 

Fred Sexton completed his first painting while still an adolescent. In 1929, Los Angeles Times Art Critic Arthur Millier viewed a small self-portrait by Sexton at a Los Angeles County Museum of Art show called “The Younger Painters.” Millier wrote that the "special hero of the moment seems to us to be one James (sic) Sexton… He transcends the ordinary sounding subject matter, making of this tiny panel a painting at once decoratively beautiful and highly expressive."

Sexton commenced studies under Stanton Macdonald-Wright at the Art Students League of Los Angeles, where he met Gwain Harriet Noot. The couple married in 1932 and relocated to France, where Sexton studied briefly with Morgan Russell. The Sextons had a child and Gwain and the baby returned to the U.S. in 1934. In 1935, Fred returned to the U.S. after a trip to Italy.

In 1935, Sexton’s paintings were exhibited at the Stendahl Galleries in Los Angeles. A Los Angeles Times review described Sexton’s work as “first-rank museum quality done by an almost unknown Los Angeles painter…masterpieces of the highest order.” Following "whistle stops" with the Treasury Relief Art Project (TRAP) program during 1936 and 1937, Sexton had a show at the Jacob Zeitlin Bookshop in Los Angeles in 1938.

During World War II, Sexton taught art, worked for several film studios, and drove a taxi to support his family. In 1939, Sexton taught evening art classes with Archie Gamer, and during the 1940s, he taught at Jepson Art Institute, California School of Design (Los Angeles), and Chouinard School of Art.

Sexton gained recognition for his floral delineations, still life, portrait, and architectural compositions. Many prominent Los Angelinos collected his works, including Edward G. Robinson, John Huston, Paulette Goddard, and the Hollywood patron Ruth Maitland. According to the Los Angeles Times, Edward G. Robinson had "bought and hung among his famous Cézannes, Van Goghs and Renoirs three new paintings...from the brush of Los Angeles artist Fred Sexton." In May and June 1941, three of Sexton’s paintings were included in a Los Angeles Museum exhibition of 56 paintings including important French Impressionists and Post-Impressionists from the collection of Mr. and Mrs. Edward G. Robinson.

In 1947, Sexton's paintings were featured in an exhibition at the John Decker Gallery in Los Angeles. In 1949, Sexton was invited to exhibit at the 21st Biennial Exhibition at the Corcoran Gallery of Art, Washington, D.C. Also in 1949, Sexton decided to revive the dormant Art Students League in Los Angeles, which reopened on September 20. Classes were held until 1953.

Afterwards, Sexton operated an import business, traveling frequently to Mexico. The Sextons divorced, and Fred later remarried and lived briefly in Palos Verdes. He divorced a second time and relocated to Mexico. There, he remarried once more, and had another daughter.

The Maltese Falcon movie prop 

In August 2013, Michele Fortier, the daughter of Fred Sexton, was interviewed on camera by UCLA Professor Vivian Sobchack, Ph.D.  Fortier recounted her father’s creation of the Maltese Falcon prop model for the Warner Bros. production of “The Maltese Falcon” in 1941, as well as visits to the film set where she interacted with actors Humphrey Bogart and Sydney Greenstreet, and director John Huston.

Fortier recalled that her father made “preliminary sketches” for the Maltese Falcon prop on a “manila envelope,” and then sculpted the model for the prop in clay. During visits to the film set, she remembered seeing a prop that was “shiny and black,” but “not like patent leather shoes.”

Fortier also identified initials inscribed in the right rear tail feather of a plaster Maltese Falcon prop owned by Hank Risan as her father’s. Fortier explained that she owns many of her father’s paintings and commented that many of the signatures feature the same idiosyncratic characteristics.

Friendship with prime Black Dahlia suspect Dr. George Hill Hodel 

Sexton from his teens forward until 1950 was a close friend of both John Huston and George Hodel. All three grew up together in Los Angeles. 
Sexton was a star witness in the 1949 Incest Trial of Dr. Hodel who was charged by LAPD with multiple counts of sexual intercourse and sexual abuse with his daughter, Tamar Hodel, then age 14. Sexton admitted his involvement in the sexual assault and claimed he too attempted to have sex with Tamar along with George Hodel and two adult females at Hodel's Sowden/Franklin House at 5121 Franklin Ave. Sexton claimed he did not actually penetrate Tamar and he took a plea agreement in exchange for his testimony against Dr. Hodel and subsequent to his testimony at Hodel's jury trial was allowed to plead to a lesser crime of "contributing to the delinquency of a minor."
Sexton remarried in the 1960s and his second wife, Gemma Taccogna, was also a successful artist. The couple bought and resided in a home in Palos Verdes Peninsula. Gemma alleged her husband, Fred Sexton molested his 11-year-old step-daughter, a child, also named Gemma, who was Taccogna's daughter from a former marriage. Upon being confronted by his wife, Sexton emptied their joint bank account and fled to Mexico. In Mexico Sexton in 1971, at age sixty-three married a teenage female in Guadalajara, Mexico. Sexton died in Guadalajara, Mexico on 9/11/95 at age 88. His final instructions to his wife were to "destroy all my personal effects." She complied.

References 

1907 births
1995 deaths
People from Goldfield, Nevada
American artists